Lactuca longifolia can refer to:

Lactuca longifolia DC., a synonym of Lactuca dolichophylla Kitam.
Lactuca longifolia Michx., a synonym of Lactuca canadensis L.
Lactuca sativa L. var. longifolia Lam., romaine lettuce